Nethertown is a railway station on the Cumbrian Coast Line, which runs between  and . It is owned by Network Rail and managed by Northern Trains.

Nethertown was the least-used station in Cumbria in 2020-21, with an estimated 254 passenger journeys made.

History

In 1914, the passing loop was expanded to cater for the increased length of trains due to World War I. In May 1916, the shunting neck was extended and an additional  of sidings were provided.

The station was host to six LMS caravans from 1937 to 1939. The station was particularly busy with passenger traffic in the 1940s–50s when it served the Nethertown military camp, which was training anti-aircraft gunners. After the war, it was reused for construction workers building the Sellafield Nuclear plant.

During the 1970s, the passing loop was removed due to a decrease in traffic and train frequency. 

As of August 2019, the only facility at the station is a passenger shelter on the single platform, but up until the early 1970s, the station had more substantial buildings as well as a signal box.

Location
The station is directly on the coast in a spectacular and remote position overlooking the Irish Sea from a small cliff. Pearson's 1992 railway guide is moved to comment, "The tiny halts at Braystones and Nethertown are as remote as anything British Rail has to offer....Nethertown station seems suspended between the cliff face and the sands". There is a vehicle track from the public highway and a footpath shortcut to the village.

Since 30 March 2021, the station has been on England's Coast Path with the opening of the St Bees to Silecroft section of the long-distance path.

On the seaward side, the remains of the sea-filled swimming pool built by the contractors from the camp can be seen.

A foot level crossing connects the platform to the station approach track, and though this offers step-free access, the platform is too low to allow level access from platform to the train. A Harrington hump has been installed to allow easier access on and off the train, the steps which were previously mounted on the platform have been removed. Timetable posters are available and there are electric lights during operating hours.

Services

As of the 15 December 2019 timetable (still current from May 2021), five trains call in each direction (on request) from Monday to Friday, with one additional departure each way on Saturdays. The timetable stated briefly in 2019 that some Saturday services do not treat the station as a request stop, this reverted to all services being request in December 2019 and may have been a printing error as all local timetables had all trains as request only. There is no late evening service, but a limited Sunday service was introduced at the May 2018 timetable change; the first to run over this section since 1976. Currently the Sunday service consists of 4 trains in each direction.

References

Sources

 100 Years of St Bees, Douglas Sim, 1995.

External links

 
 

Railway stations in Cumbria
DfT Category F2 stations
Former Furness Railway stations
Railway stations in Great Britain opened in 1849
Northern franchise railway stations
Railway request stops in Great Britain
1849 establishments in England